Christian Ek (born 5 February 1959) is a Swedish sports shooter. He competed in the mixed skeet event at the 1984 Summer Olympics.

References

External links
 

1959 births
Living people
Swedish male sport shooters
Olympic shooters of Sweden
Shooters at the 1984 Summer Olympics
Sportspeople from Uppsala